Marisa J. Demeo (born August 23, 1966) is an associate judge of the Superior Court of the District of Columbia.

Early life and education
Demeo was born in Washington, D.C.  She received a Bachelor of Arts degree in Politics with a concentration in Latin American studies from Princeton University in 1988 and a Juris Doctor from the New York University School of Law in 1993. Demeo then worked in the Civil Rights Division of the Department of Justice for four years. She then worked at the Mexican American Legal Defense and Educational Fund from 1997 until 2004, when she joined the United States Attorney’s Office for the District of Columbia (USAO) as an Assistant United States Attorney, where she prosecuted criminal cases.

Judicial service
In 2007, Demeo was appointed to be a magistrate judge on the Superior Court of the District of Columbia.

On March 24, 2009, President Barack Obama nominated Demeo to be an associate judge on the Superior Court of the District of Columbia.  Demeo's nomination drew opposition from Republican senators due to her opposition of Miguel Estrada's nomination to the United States Court of Appeals for the District of Columbia Circuit, her work for the Mexican American Legal Defense and Educational Fund, and her support of same-sex marriage.  On April 20, 2010, Demeo was confirmed by the United States Senate by a vote of 66-32.

See also
 List of Hispanic/Latino American jurists
 List of LGBT jurists in the United States

References

External links

1966 births
Living people
21st-century American judges
21st-century American women judges
Hispanic and Latino American judges
Judges of the Superior Court of the District of Columbia
Lawyers from Washington, D.C.
LGBT appointed officials in the United States
LGBT judges
New York University School of Law alumni
Princeton University alumni